Team Florida may refer to:
 Team Florida (AAFL), American football team in the All American Football League
Team Florida (Cycling), University of Florida Cycling Club
 Team Florida (inline skating), Inline speed skating team sanctioned by USA Roller Sports